The Meeting on the Turret Stairs (or Hellelil and Hildebrand, the Meeting on the Turret Stairs)  is an 1864 watercolor painting by Frederic William Burton.  The painting  is in the National Gallery of Ireland.

The subject of the painting is the love story of Hellelil, who fell in love with her personal guard Hildebrand. The story was taken from a medieval Danish ballad translated as Hellalyle and Hildebrand by the painter's friend Whitley Stokes and published in Fraser's Magazine, 1855, Vol. 51, p. 89. 
The poet's sister Margaret Stokes later presented it to the museum.

She sat in her bower, with eyes of flame,
(My sorrow is known to God alone.)
Bending over the broidery frame,
(And oh there liveth none to whom my sorrow may be told.)...

The translation of the same poem by William Morris called Hildebrand And Hellelil is more famous:
<poem>
Hellelil sitteth in bower there,
None knows my grief but God alone,
And seweth at the seam so fair,
I never wail my sorrow to any other one...</poem>

Original Scandinavian ballads are Stolts Hilla (Geijer & Afzelius #32) and Hilla Lilla (Ahlström No. 268)''.

George Eliot noted about it: ‘The subject might have been made the most vulgar thing in the world – the artist has raised it to the highest pitch of refined emotion’.

It was voted by the Irish public as Ireland's favourite painting in 2012 from among 10 works shortlisted by critics.

Link
 National Gallery of Ireland: Hellelil and Hildebrand, the Meeting on the Turret Stairs by Frederic William Burton

References

1864 paintings
Watercolor paintings
Pre-Raphaelite paintings